Jordon is both a surname and a given name. Notable people with the name include:

Surname
Darren Jordon (born 1960), British journalist
Mark Jordon (born 1965), English actor
Phil Jordon (1933–1965), American basketball player
Ray Jordon (1937–2012), Australian cricketer
Robert E. Jordon, American academic

Given name
Jordon Brown (born 1992), Scottish footballer
Jordon Dizon (born 1986), American football player
Jordon Forster (born 1993), Scottish footballer
Jordon Ibe (born 1995), English footballer
Jordon Mutch (born 1991), English footballer
Jordon Nardino, American television writer
Jordon Southorn (born 1990), Canadian ice hockey player
Jordon Zadorozny (born c. 1974), Canadian musician
Jordon Martinez Lacken (born 1993), Irish Entrepreneur

See also
Jordon, Illinois, a former town in Illinois, United States
Jordan (disambiguation)